Chrysobothris harrisi (sometimes misspelled as "harrisii") is a species of metallic wood-boring beetle in the family Buprestidae.

References

Further reading

 
 
 

Buprestidae
Articles created by Qbugbot
Beetles described in 1827